Nikola Atanasov was a Bulgarian revolutionary and a politician from the eastern part of Macedonia.

Biography

Nikola Atanasov was born to a poor family in the village of Fotovishta, today known as Ognyanovo in Garmen Municipality, then part of the Ottoman Empire. He won a scholarship and finished the Bulgarian Theological School in Constantinople. He returned in Macedonia and entered the Internal Macedonian-Adrianople Revolutionary Organization (IMARO) by joining the revolutionary bands of Stoyan Filipov and Stoyan Malchankov.

After the liberation of Pirin Macedonia in the Balkan Wars in 1912, Atanasov worked in the tax administration of Nevrokop, today known as Gotse Delchev. At the same time, he continued to participate in the activities of the revolutionary organization.

In April 1926, Atanasov was elected mayor of Nevrokop and remained in this position until May 1932. As mayor, he planned the public organization of the town – he created the first urbanization plan, he constructed a water-conduit and an electricity grid, he built a new secondary school. In his memoirs, Ivan Mihaylov wrote the following about Atanasov:

After the Bulgarian coup d'état of 1934, and the strike against the IMARO, Atanasov was interned in Lovech. After the Bulgarian coup d'état of 1944, Atanasov hid in the village of Zagrade. Surrounded by the militia, Atanasov showed resistance and was severely wounded in his backbone. Although he was in a stretcher, he was prosecuted by the so-called People's Court, a temporary Bulgarian judiciary institution, which was active in the period between December 19, 1944 and April 1945. He was killed with pick-mattocks in the garden of the Nevrokop prison.

References

1886 births
1945 deaths
People from Garmen
Members of the Internal Macedonian Revolutionary Organization
Bulgarian revolutionaries
Macedonian Bulgarians
Mayors of places in Bulgaria
Bulgarian people who died in prison custody
Prisoners murdered in custody
Prisoners who died in Bulgarian detention